Tequesquite or tequexquite (from Nahuatl tequixquitl) is a natural mineral salt containing compounds of sodium chloride, sodium carbonate, and sodium sulphate, used in Mexico since pre-Hispanic times mainly as a food seasoning. It is found naturally in central Mexico particularly in previously lacustrine environments where the mineral salt forms a sedimentary crust.
 
Chemically it is an alkaline rock composed of various minerals, which changes its ratio according to where it is obtained. It consists mainly of sodium bicarbonate and common salt (sodium chloride), but also contains potassium carbonate, sodium sulfate and clay. Its appearance is similar to that of common table salt in coarseness, but with a more greyish color.
 
It is classified into four types: mousse, confitillo, husk and dust. The first two are obtained from the recession of water, and the latter two as natural efflorescence. The latter contain more dirt, so the other two are preferred.
 
In industry it is also used with fats - saponified to make soap and prepare canvases.
 
Some locations in Mexico where it is mined are Lake Texcoco, Tequixquiac and Tequexquinahuac in the state of Mexico, Laguna Tequesquitengo in the state of Morelos, Nopalucan and Tequexquitla, in the state of Tlaxcala , Tequisquiapan, in the state of Querétaro, Tequesquite, in the state of Jalisco, Totolcingo lagoon in the state of Puebla and La Salada, in the state of Zacatecas.
 
Sometimes it is confused with Potassium nitrate, but its chemical composition is completely different.

History
At the time of the Aztecs, was obtained from Lake Texcoco, especially in the dry season. This lake is salt water, and when the water level of the lake fell or retreated, the water evaporates remained as sediment in some wells tequesquite salt. It is also found as efflorescent natural formation, leaving the soil by capillarity. Another place where salt was abundant was Iztapalapa, which also traded salt. For the Aztecs, salt was a luxury, so the lower classes could not afford it easily.
 
As of 2020, it can be bought in the markets of some towns in Mexico; it is still an ingredient used in many dishes. However, baking soda and table salt may be used as a substitute, but tradition dictates that the taste of tequesquite cannot be replaced.

In cooking
Tequesquite has many uses as an ingredient in traditional Mexican dishes. It is mainly used in products made from corn, such as tamales, to accentuate their flavor. The corn is usually boiled with it. It is also used for cooking nopales and other vegetables as it retains their bright green color, to soften dried beans, and as a meat tenderizer, similar to sodium bicarbonate.
 
It can be used as a leavening agent. To prepare, boil a solid tequestuite stone and the shells of ten tomatillos in a cup of water. Once the stone has been dissolved and the water has boiled remove from heat and let stand. When it is cold it is strained and added to the masa. Another recipe indicates the same procedure, but using 15 grams of tequesquite, 15 tomatillo shells and 1/4 L water.

In the novel Como agua para chocolate (Like Water for Chocolate) by Mexican author Laura Esquivel, tequesquite is used in the dish frijoles gordos con chile a la tezcucano (fat beans with chili Tezcucano style).

Other uses
Tequesquite is also used in the preparation of cobalt blue and orange that is used to decorate handmade pieces, especially in Puebla Talavera.

References

Mexican cuisine